Labour Party leadership elections were held in the following countries in 1988:

1988 Labour Party leadership election (UK)
1988 New Zealand Labour Party leadership election